Sauce poivrade, sometimes called sauce au poivre, is a peppery sauce in French cuisine.

It is made of a cooked mirepoix thickened with flour and moistened with wine and a little vinegar, then heavily seasoned with black pepper. More traditional versions in French haute cuisine use sauce espagnole, one of the French mother sauces, as a thickener.

See also
 List of sauces
 Wine sauce

Notes

French sauces